Alimardon Abitalipovich Shukurov (born 28 September 1999) is a Kyrgyz professional footballer who plays as a midfielder for the Kyrgyzstan national team.

Career statistics

International

Statistics accurate as of match played 10 October 2019

International goals
Scores and results list Kyrgyzstan's goal tally first.

References

External links

1999 births
Living people
Kyrgyzstani footballers
Association football midfielders
Kyrgyzstan international footballers
TFF First League players
Kyrgyzstani expatriate footballers
Expatriate footballers in Turkey
Kyrgyzstani expatriate sportspeople in Turkey
Expatriate footballers in Belarus
Kyrgyzstani expatriate sportspeople in Belarus
FC Abdysh-Ata Kant players
Boluspor footballers
FC Neman Grodno players